The Highland treefrog (Litoria wollastoni), or Wollaston's treefrog, is a species of frog in the subfamily Pelodryadinae, found in West New Guinea. Its natural habitats are subtropical or tropical moist lowland forests, subtropical or tropical moist montane forests, rivers, rural gardens, and heavily degraded former forests. It was named in honour of the British naturalist and explorer Sandy Wollaston, who collected the holotype on the Setakwa River, southern Netherlands New Guinea in 1912–1913. The holotype is housed in the Natural History Museum, London, accession number BMNH 1947.2.23.59.

References

Litoria
Amphibians described in 1914
Taxonomy articles created by Polbot